Bernhard Mayer (1866–1946) was a German fur trader, anarchist, patron and art collector.

Early life 
Bernhard Mayer came from a Jewish family from the Hunsrück region. His father ran a grocery store, his mother was a housewife. At the age of eleven, he left his parents to attend school in Bad Kreuznach. He broke off his education and worked first in Simmern, then Saarbrücken, Saargemünd and finally in 1885 in Aachen.

Fur trade 
He moved to Brussels in 1892. He began an apprenticeship as a furrier in 1895 and after initial difficulties his fur business flourished and he opened branches in Paris, Berlin, Zurich and Amsterdam, run by members of the family. The poet Else Lasker-Schüler jokingly called him Mink Bernardo. In 1897 he married Auguste Lipper (1875-1958) and with her had son Ernst (1901) and daughter Lilly (1903). In Brussels in 1903 he had bought two pictures from an outsider, James Ensor, as support; Guste and he thus laid the foundation for an unsystematically built up collection of pictures.

Mayer supported socialism and anarchism. His connections with anarchists brought him to Ascona in 1909, where he built a home.

At the beginning of World War I, Mayer, as a German, had to leave Belgium; he went to Berlin and in 1916 to Zurich, then to Ascona.

Art collector 
The Munich art historian Franz Stadler encouraged him to buy pictures by French Impressionists, but only first-class works. In 1926, Mr. and Mrs. Mayer had the Teatro San Materno built for the dancer Charlotte Bara in Ascona. Mayer was also otherwise active as a patron and collector of art, acquiring paintings by Cézanne, van Gogh, Renoir, Matisse and Picasso, among others, primarily in the 1920s. In a hotel built especially for this purpose in Ascona, he hosted numerous writers and artists, especially emigrants, such as Holitscher, Ehrenstein, the Fritsch couple, Else Lasker-Schüler and many others. Famous first works, such as those of Ignazio Silone, were published only thanks to his financial guarantee. Where it was possible, he did it anonymously.

Nazi persecution and emigration 
In 1941, he fled from the National Socialists to the USA; he had already taken some of his pictures to safety there in 1936, while others were lost. In New York City in 1944, with Guste's help, he wrote his memoirs, which he dedicated to his four grandchildren. After the end of the war he returned with the paintings to his house in Ascona. Guste Mayer died there in 1958.

Part of his art collection found its place as inspiration, incentive and catalyst.  in the Merzbacher Collection of his granddaughter Gabrielle Merzbacher-Mayer and her husband Werner Merzbacher.

Selected works 

 Bernhard Mayer: Interessante Zeitgenossen. Lebenserinnerungen eines jüdischen Kaufmanns und Weltbürgers. Hrsg. von Erhard Roy Wiehn. Hartung-Gorre Verlag, Konstanz 1998 (Autobiographie und Beiträge, deutsch und engl.), ISBN 3-89191-888-7.

References

Bibliography

Further reading 

 Christian Klemm (Hrsg.): Die Sammlung Bernhard Mayer : Ausstellung im Kunsthaus Zürich, 19. Juni bis 23. August 1998. Kunsthaus, Zürich 1998.
 darin: Harald Szeemann: Die Sammlung Bernhard Mayer. S. 9–16.
 Hans-Werner Johann: Bernhard Mayer: Jugenderinnerungen eines Laufersweiler Juden. Wiedergegeben und ergänzt von Hans-Werner Johann in Glaube und Heimat, Nr. 9–12, 1991

External links 

 Bernhard Mayer Papers in the International Institute of Social History

1946 deaths
1866 births
People who emigrated to escape Nazism
German art collectors
Patrons of the visual arts
Fur traders
Furriers
Jews who emigrated to escape Nazism